Kolpur Railway Station is located in Kolpur town, Mastung district of Balochistan province, Pakistan.

Services
The following trains stop at Kolpur station:

See also
 List of railway stations in Pakistan
 Pakistan Railways

References

Railway stations in Mastung District
Railway stations on Rohri–Chaman Railway Line